Hugo Kingsley Johnstone-Burt (born 1988) is a Scottish-Australian actor. He grew up in Sydney and decided to become an actor after attending his first drama class. Johnstone-Burt graduated from the National Institute of Dramatic Art in 2009. He appeared in small roles in Australian dramas Rake, Sea Patrol and Underbelly: The Golden Mile, before he was cast as Fish Lamb in Cloudstreet. The role earned him two ASTRA Award nominations. Johnstone-Burt went on to star in Carelesss Love and he took on the role of Constable Hugh Collins in ABC1's Miss Fisher's Murder Mysteries. In 2012, Johnstone-Burt appeared in Tricky Business and filmed a guest role in Home and Away. He has also appeared in the musical drama film Goddess (2013) and the disaster film San Andreas (2015).

Early life
Johnstone-Burt was born in Edinburgh, Scotland. He moved to Australia with his family when he was two years old, and grew up in Sydney. His parents were both in the navy. His brother is in the army, while his sister is a lawyer. Johnstone-Burt told TV Week's Erin Miller that he chose a career in acting because he was not good at anything in high school, saying "I was a bit of a clown and liked to muck around and make people laugh, and then I went to my first drama class and thought, 'Well, amazing, I can do this for the rest of my life.'" His parents supported his career choice and after leaving Barker College, Johnstone-Burt auditioned for the National Institute of Dramatic Art (NIDA) aged 18. However, he was told he was too young to attend and he decided to go travelling instead. When he returned to Australia, Johnstone-Burt auditioned for NIDA again and was accepted. For his graduation play in 2009, he took on the role of Jack in The Importance of Being Earnest.

Career
Johnstone-Burt had small roles in episodes of Rake and Sea Patrol and starred in the film Before the Rain. He also appeared as "a young thug" in Underbelly: The Golden Mile. The actor stated that the role allowed him to play tougher than he is in real life and commented that it "gives you a bit of a rush." Johnstone-Burt garnered a nomination for an Out of the Box award from the Inside Film Awards.

A week before he graduated from NIDA, Johnstone-Burt was approached to play the brain damaged Fish Lamb in the television adaptation of Tim Winton's Cloudstreet. After attending the audition, the actor believed he had done a good enough job to secure the role. He told a The Daily Telegraph reporter, "I supposed I walked out thinking I did a good job – seeing how I worked with [director Matthew Saville] and taking his direction. Then I had to sit by my phone for a month and hopefully get a call." To prepare for the role, Johnstone-Burt visited a home for people with intellectual disabilities and he then spent four months shooting the miniseries in Western Australia.

For his performance in Cloudstreet, the actor earned nominations for Best New Talent and Most Outstanding Performance by an Actor at the 2012 ASTRA Awards. A reporter for the Herald Sun also included Johnstone-Burt in their "11 Faces To Watch in 2011" list. The actor next appeared as Seb in John Duigan's film Careless Love. He also travelled to Hollywood for the pilot season, where he auditioned for upcoming television shows and films. Johnstone-Burt was then cast as Constable Hugh Collins in ABC TV's Miss Fisher's Murder Mysteries, a drama series based on Kerry Greenwood's Phryne Fisher historical mysteries. Miss Fisher's Murder Mysteries was renewed for a second series in which he reprised his role.

In March 2012, Johnstone-Burt joined the cast of drama series Tricky Business. The following month, Johnstone-Burt revealed that he had filmed a guest role for the soap opera Home and Away. The actor called his character, Jamie Sharpe, "a super-creepy stalker guy" and said he had worked a lot with Ada Nicodemou (Leah Patterson-Baker). He also appeared alongside Magda Szubanski in the musical drama film Goddess.

In 2015, Johnstone-Burt continued to appear in his role of Hugh in the third season of Miss Fisher's Murder Mysteries. He also had a leading role in the feature film San Andreas, alongside Dwayne Johnson. Johnstone-Burt appeared in the Network Ten drama The Wrong Girl as Vincent, the brother of lead character Lily played by Jessica Marais.

In 2020, he retake his role of constable Hugh Collins in Miss Fisher and the Crypt of Tears.

Personal life
Johnstone-Burt has been in a relationship with Nine News reporter Julie Snook since 2016. The couple announced their engagement in November 2019.

Filmography

References

External links
 

1987 births
Living people
Australian male television actors
Male actors from Sydney
21st-century Australian male actors
Australian male film actors
National Institute of Dramatic Art alumni